Miss America's Outstanding Teen 2016 was the 10th Miss America's Outstanding Teen pageant held at the Linda Chapin Theater in the Orange County Convention Center in Orlando, Florida on August 1, 2015. At the conclusion of the event, Olivia McMillan of Georgia crowned her successor Allie Nault of New Hampshire. The pageant was hosted by Miss America 2015 Kira Kazantsev and Greg Hutson.

Results

Placements

§ America's Choice

Awards

Preliminary awards

Non-finalist awards

Talent awards

Children's Miracle Network (CMN) National Miracle Maker awards

Teens in Action award

Other awards

Contestants

References

2016
2015 in Florida
2016 beauty pageants
August 2015 events in the United States